The 2016–17 season was Atlético Madrid's 86th season in existence and the club's 80th season in La Liga, the top league of Spanish football. Atlético competed in La Liga, Copa del Rey and UEFA Champions League.

Kits
Supplier: Nike / First Sponsor: Plus500

Season overview

June
On 16 June, Atlético reached an agreement with Benfica for the €25 million transfer of winger Nicolás Gaitán.

July

On 4 July, Atlético reached an agreement with striker Fernando Torres on a one-year contract after his contract with Milan expired following the end of his 2015–16 loan stint with Atlético. On 5 July, the club announced it had signed right back Šime Vrsaljko to a five-year contract after the club reached an agreement for his transfer from Sassuolo for €16 million. On 6 July, Atlético agreed to send defensive midfielder Matías Kranevitter to Sevilla on loan for the 2016–17 season for a €2 million fee. The following day, the club confirmed an agreement with Newcastle United for the transfer of right back Jesús Gámez on a free deal.
On 9 July, the club confirmed a €3.5 million agreement with Espanyol for the transfer of striker Léo Baptistão; Baptistão had spent the 2015–16 on loan at Villarreal. On 12 July, an agreement was reached with Girona over the transfer of Bono; Bono had spent the 2015–16 on loan at Zaragoza. On 14 July, Atlético presented its home and away kit for the 2016–17 season.

On 15 July, the schedule for the 2016–17 La Liga season was released; Atlético will play his first league match at home on 21 August against newly promoted Alavés. On 23 July, Atlético played its first friendly game of the pre-season, winning the IV Jesús Gil y Gil Memorial after defeating Numancia 2–0 from a goal from Fernando Torres and an own goal from Francisco Regalón. On 26 July, Atlético took 24 players on its tour of Australian to play two fixtures, one being in the 2016 International Champions Cup. In the tour's first match, the club defeated Tottenham Hotspur 1–0 through a Diego Godín goal. On 30, July the club reached a €32 million agreement for the transfer of striker Kevin Gameiro from Sevilla. The club also reached an agreement with Sevilla for the loan of striker Luciano Vietto for the 2016–17 season. Atlético's second and final match in Australia was played on 31 July, a 1–0 defeat to the Melbourne Victory.

August
On 6 August, Atlético was set to play its fourth pre-season match on 6 August against Galatasaray, but the match was canceled due to circumstances in Turkey. Atlético instead organized a replacement match on 6 August against Crotone. On 4 August, Atlético announced it had extended the contract of Theo Hernandez, and that he would be loaned out to Alavés for the 2016–17 season. On 6 August, the club played its fourth match of the pre-season under "LaLiga World", defeating Crotone 2–0 via Nicolas Gaitán and Diogo Jota goals. That same day, the club extended the contract of centre back Lucas Hernandez until 2020. On 11 August, the club has reached an €18 million agreement with Swansea City for the transfer of striker Borja Bastón.

Atlético played his fifth game of the pre-season competing for the Ramón de Carranza Trophy. The club was defeated by Cádiz in a penalty shootout after a dubious penalty in the 90th minute led to Cádiz nullifying Yannick Carrasco's goal. Atlético's last opponent in the current pre-season was "Nigeria All Star". Shortly before the match on 13 August, Atlético and Villarreal reached an agreement for the loan of Rafael Santos Borré for the 2016–17 season. In the last friendly match, Atlético won and finished third in the Carranza after beating Nigeria All Stars; goals were scored by Gaitán and Godín. Atlético finished its pre-season with a record of 4–1–1, scoring eight goals and conceding three.

After the clubs had already agreed the loan deal of André Moreira to Belenenses, the clubs later reached an agreement cancelling the deal. On 18 August, Atlético has reached an agreement with Vitória de Guimarães for the loan of Bernard Mensah for the remainder of the season. Atlético also confirmed the transfer of Axel Werner from Argentinian club Atlético Rafaela; he was immediately loaned to Boca Juniors. Atlético also loaned out Emiliano Velázquez to Braga.

In its first league match, on 22 August, Atlético drew against Alavés 1–1, with a penalty scored by Kevin Gameiro. On 25 August, Atlético has reached an agreement with Sunderland for the loan of Javier Manquillo and an agreement with Porto for the loan of Óliver. On the same day, Atlético were drawn into Group D of the Champions League alongside German champion Bayern Munich, Dutch champion PSV and runner-up in the Russian championship Rostov. On 27 August, the club has reached an agreement with Porto for the loan of Diogo Jota until the end of the season. Atlético drew in its second league match against newly promoted Leganés, 0–0.

September 
Two goals from Griezmann, one from Koke and one from Correa was enough for high victory against Celta. On 13 September, Atlético played its first match in the Champions League group stage, winning 1–0 over PSV, with goal by Saúl. With five goals, two from Griezmann, two from Torres and one from Gameiro, the team beat Sporting. Correa scores a valuable tie against Barcelona for third draw. The goal from Griezmann was enough for another win in the league over Deportivo. In its second match in the Champions League, Atlético won 1–0 at home stadium over Bayern Munich; the goal scored Carrasco.

October 
Atlético beat Valencia thanks to goals from the Griezmann and Gameiro. The Valencia's goalkeeper also saved two penalties from Griezmann and Gabi. On 14 October, Atlético was drawn in the round of 32 of the 2016–17 Copa del Rey against Guijuelo. Hat-trick of Carrasco, two Gaitan and one of Correa and Tiago were defeated 7–1 by Granada. Third win of Atlético in the Champions against Rostov reached thanks to Carrasco's goal. First defeat of the season for team came from Sevilla with a goal from Nzonzi. Last match in October, Atlético brought a difficult victory over Málaga. Carrasco and Gameiro had scored each twice.

November 
Atlético suffered, but two goals from Griezmann were enough to beat Rostov. Two penalties decided the game for Real Sociedad and second defeat in the league for the team. On 19 November, Real Madrid defeated Atlético in the first Madrid derby of the season, with a hat-trick from Ronaldo. In the fifth game of the Champions League group stage Atletico came to victory over PSV Eindhoven 2–0 with goals by Gameiro and Griezmann. Atlético announced it would play a friendly match against Al-Ittihad on 30 December. Goals from Godín and Gameiro eliminated Osasuna in a minute. Carrasco ended the final goal. Two goals from Carrasco and one each from Vrsaljko, Correa, Rober and Saúl secured a 6–0 victory in the first leg of the Copa del Rey, round of 32, over Guijuelo.

December
In its first match of December, Atlético drew with Espanyol (0–0). Atlético was defeated in its last Champions League group stage match, against Bayern Munich; Atlético nonetheless finished first in its group to progress to the competition's round of 16. On 12 December, Atlético was drawn to face Bayer Leverkusen for the Champions League round of 16. Atlético lost to Villarreal. Atlético closed the league in 2016 with a win against Las Palmas, with Saúl scoring the match's only goal. After the first-leg win away at Guijuelo in the Copa del Rey, the second-leg was decided in the first half with four goals scored by Nicolás Gaitán, Ángel Correa, Juanfran and Fernando Torres to send the club to the round of 16, 10–1 on aggregate. On 30 December, Atlético play the last game of the year with a friendly against Al-Ittihad and won by 3–2, with goals from Juanfran, Torres and Giménez.

January 
The new year for the team began with a 2–0 victory against Las Palmas in the first leg of the cup last 16; Koke
and Griezmann scored. On 7 January, the team reached important victory in the first league match of 2017. They defeated Eibar with goals by Saúl and Griezmann. Although Las Palmas won the second leg match of the cup last 16 and Griezmann and Correa scored the goals, for the team was enough the advantage of the first leg to advance to the quarter-finals. On 13 January, Atlético was drawn in the quarterfinals of the cup against Eibar. The team achieve victory against Betis with goal by Gaitán. Atlético wins an important match in the first leg of the cup quarter-finals against Eibar. Griezmann, Correa and Gameiro scored the goals. Goals from Koke and Griezmann to win an important point against Athletic Bilbao. The score 2–2 on Ipurua and 5–2 on aggregate for Atlético, put the team in the semi-finals of the cup tournament. On 27 January, Atlético was drawn in the semi-finals of the cup against Barcelona. Atlético again drew against Alavés.

February 
On 1 February, Atlético lost 1–2 against Barcelona in the first leg of the Copa del Rey semi-final; Griezmann scored for Atlético. Fernando Torres scored the two goals for the victory against Leganés. Atlético drew 1–1 in the second leg of the Copa del Rey semi-final, but this was not enough to qualify for the finals owing to Barcelona's 1–2 victory in the first leg. The great goals from Torres and Carrasco tied two times over Celta, but Griezmann scored on 88 minutes to give the victory to the home team. Carrasco scored the first goal and Gameiro scored his hattrick in five minutes for victory over Sporting Gijón. Saúl, Griezmann, Gameiro from a penalty kick, and Torres scored in the win in Leverkusen that end with a results 2–4. A goal by Godín was not enough to avoid defeat against Barcelona.

March 
On 2 March, Atlético drew with Deportivo, with goal by Griezmann. A brace by Griezmann and a goal by Gameiro beat Valencia. Griezmann scored the goal of an important victory over Granada with a goal in the final stretch of the match. The victory of the first leg (2–4) was enough after the goalless tie at the Calderón. Atlético advanced to the quarter-finals of the Champions League, 4–2 on aggregate. On 17 March, in the draw for the quarter-finals of the Champions League, Atlético will face Leicester City. Godín, Griezmann and Koke scored the goals against Sevilla.

April
The team won against Málaga with goals by Koke and Filipe Luis. With goal by Filipe Luis, Atlético beat Real Sociedad. On 8 April, Atlético tied at the Bernabéu against Real Madrid. Griezmann scored the goal for the team. Griezmann, from a penalty, scored a goal, that defeated the Leicester in the first leg of the Champions League quarterfinal. Atlético added another win against Osasuna thanks to two goals by Carrasco and one by Filipe Luis. Goal by Saúl secured the pass of Atlético to the Champions League semi-finals after drawing over Leicester City 1–1 (2–1 on aggregate). On 21 April, in the draw for the semi-finals of the Champions League, Atlético will face Real Madrid Atlético beat Espanyol with a goal by Griezmann. In the 34th round of league the team lose against Villarreal by 0–1. Atlético beat Las Palmas with three goals in 18 minutes by Gameiro (2) and Saúl.

May
Atlético Madrid lost in the semifinals of the Champions League against Real Madrid in the first leg after a Cristiano Ronaldo hat-trick saw them lose 3-0. A goal by Saúl was enough for victory against Eibar. A victory in the second leg of the semifinals of the Champions League was not enough to advance to the final as Real Madrid advanced 4–2 on aggregate. A goal by Savić gave Atlético a tie against Real Betis. The season for Atletico ended on 21 May, with the last matchday of the league and the last official fixture at the Vicente Calderón. The team beat Athletic Bilbao 3–1, Torres with two goals and Correa with one. The team finished in third position.

Players

Staff

Coaching staff

Medical

Management

Transfers

In

Out

Pre-season and friendlies

Summer

Winter

Competitions

La Liga

League table

Results by round

Matches

Source: Atlético Madrid.com

Copa del Rey

Round of 32

Round of 16

Quarter-finals

Semi-finals

UEFA Champions League

Group stage

Knockout phase

Round of 16

Quarter-finals

Semi-finals

Statistics

Squad statistics
Match played 21 May 2017.

1Players from reserve team – Atlético Madrid B.

Goalscorers
As of matches played 21 May 2017.

1Player from reserve team.

Hat-tricks

Clean sheets
Match played 21 May 2017.

Attendances

Awards

La Liga Player of the Month
Antoine Griezmann named Liga Santander Player of the Month for September.
Antoine Griezmann named Liga Santander Player of the Month for March.

La Liga Manager of the Month
Diego Simeone named Liga Santander Manager of the Month for March.

Ricardo Zamora Trophy
Jan Oblak awarded with Ricardo Zamora Trophy as a goalkeeper who has the lowest goals-to-game ratio for the 2016/17 season.

Notes

References

External links

Atlético Madrid seasons
Atletico Madrid
Atletico Madrid
Atletico Madrid